Cactus Choir was an American country music group from San Francisco, California composed of Marty Atkinson (vocals), Gary Hooker (guitar), Dave Ristrim (steel guitar), Tim Hensley (banjo), Shane Hicks (keyboards), Cal Ball (bass) and Eric Nelson (drums). The group's self-titled debut album was released by Curb/Universal on March 24, 1998. Jesse Mullins of American Cowboy gave the album a favorable review, writing that the musicians "come from varied musical backgrounds but have blended their talents well." Mullins compared their "wistful harmonies" to Restless Heart and Blackhawk.

The group's first single, "Step Right Up", was released on December 9, 1997. It peaked at number 62 on the Billboard Hot Country Singles & Tracks chart. A music video for the song aired on CMT.

In 2011, Atkinson formed the duo Blue Cactus Choir with Katy Boyd.

Discography

Albums

Singles

Music videos

References

Country music groups from California
Curb Records artists
Musical groups established in 1997
Musical groups disestablished in 1998
Musical groups from San Francisco